Suining railway station may refer to:
Suining railway station (Jiangsu)
Suining railway station (Sichuan)